National Highway 927D, commonly called NH 927D is a national highway in  India. It is a spur road of National Highway 27. NH-927D traverses the state of Gujarat in India.

Route 
Dhoraji- Jam Kandorna - Kalavad(Shitla) - Jamnagar.

Junctions  
 
Terminal with National Highway 27 near Dhoraji.

See also 
 List of National Highways in India by highway number

References

External links
NH 927D on OpenStreetMap

National highways in India
National Highways in Gujarat
Transport in Jamnagar